Inexorable is a 2021 Belgian-French thriller film written by Joséphine Darcy Hopkins and Fabrice du Welz, who is also the director. The film stars Benoît Poelvoorde, Alba Gaïa Bellugi, Mélanie Doutey, Jackie Berroyer and Anaël Snoek. The film premiered at the 47th Deauville Film Festival on 7 September 2021. It was theatrically released in France on 6 April 2022.

Cast
 Benoît Poelvoorde as Marcel Bellmer
 Mélanie Doutey as Jeanne Drahi Bellmer
 Alba Gaïa Bellugi as Gloria Bartel
 Janaïna Halloy Fokan as Lucie Drahi Bellmer
 Jackie Berroyer as Le taulier
 Anaël Snoek as Paola

Reception 
Review aggregator website Rotten Tomatoes reported that 73% of 15 reviews of the film were positive.

References

External links
 

French thriller films
Belgian thriller films
2021 films
2021 thriller films
2020s French films